Sara Lloyd-Gregory (born 19 August 1986), also billed as Sara Gregory, is a Welsh actress. She is known for her leading role in the S4C drama series Alys, and appearing in the Sky1 series Thorne: Sleepyhead.

Early life
Sara Gregory was born in Ammanford, West Wales in 1986 to Yvonne (née Lloyd) and Adrian Gregory, a member of the Welsh rugby team, The Gregory Brothers. She attended Maes yr Yrfa School in Cross Hands and had studied ballet from the age of three. However, she was intent on becoming a dancer until the age of 16 until she developed an interest in acting. Following her high school graduation, she went on to study at Gorseinon College in Swansea for a brief time, although her ambition to perform would prevail and she went on the enrol at the Royal Welsh College of Music & Drama, a  conservatoire in Cardiff, for which she never graduated, and instead opted to pursue a career on screen, a decision which proved successful due to her affiliation with the Mark Jermin Stage School and his agency.

Career

Her debut came in 2003 in Stopping Distance, a film about gang rape in which she appeared as a teenage girl called Melanie. In 2004, she made her second stage appearance, this time as teenager Julie Osman—the daughter of a Turkish Muslim man who was the victim of a racially motivated murder in South Wales—in A Way of Life.

In 2006, she completed a hat-trick of appearances in controversial films by portraying the role of a girl called Serena in Little White Lies. The film was a comedy which featured racism and was, like A Way of Life, filmed in South Wales. Later that year, she starred in the Torchwood episode "Day One" as a young woman called Carys Fletcher who is possessed by an alien that feeds off orgasmic energy. In 2007, she became one of the regular cast of the BBC Wales drama Belonging, as Nadine Weaver.

In 2008, she played the female lead in Romeo and Juliet at the New Theatre, Cardiff.

In 2011, she starred in the lead role of the new S4C Welsh television series Alys. She returned for the second season of Alys which was broadcast in late 2012. In 2013, Sara won the BAFTA Cymru Award for Best Actress, following her role as Alys.

In 2018 and 2019, she played Amy in two series of the BBC Wales mockumentary Tourist Trap.

Personal life 
Gregory's partner is actor Carwyn Jones; they have a son, Idris.

Filmography

References

External links 
 
 
 

1986 births
Living people
Welsh television actresses
Welsh stage actresses
People from Ammanford